South West 1 East is an English, level six, rugby union league in south and south-west England; mainly Bedfordshire, Berkshire, Buckinghamshire, Dorset, Gloucester, Northamptonshire, Oxfordshire, Warwickshire and Wiltshire. Originally a single division known as South West 2, since 1996 the division has been split into two regional leagues – South West 1 East and South West 1 West.

The champions are promoted to South West Premier (formerly National League 3 South West) and the runner-up play the second team in South West 1 West, with the winning team gaining promotion. Relegated sides usually play in one of the two seventh-tier leagues (depending on location) – Southern Counties North or Southern Counties South.

2021–22
The teams competing in 2021–22 achieved their places in the league based on performances in 2019–20, the 'previous season' column in the table below refers to that season not 2020–21. Old Patesians finished 9th in season 2019–20 but were level transferred to South West 1 West.

Participating teams and locations

League table

2020–21
Due to the ongoing coronavirus pandemic the season was cancelled.

2019–20
The season ended before all the matches were completed because of the coronavirus pandemic and the RFU used a best playing record formula to decide the final table.

Participating teams and locations

League table

2018–19

Participating teams and locations

Promotion play-off
This seasons play-off for promotion to the South West Premier was between Launceston and Old Centralians. Launceston had the better playing record and hosted the match at Polson Bridge, winning 33 – 22. This was the 19th play-off match, the first for Launceston and the second for Old Centralians who won promotion in 2013 beating Camborne by 25 – 15. It was the 13th win for the home team and south-west teams have also won the match on 13 occasions.

2017–18

Participating teams and location
The 2017–18 South West 1 East consisted of fourteen teams; five from Oxfordshire, four from Wiltshire, two from Gloucestershire and one each from Buckinghamshire, Dorset and Warwickshire. Nine of the fourteen teams participated in last season's competition.

2016–17

Participating teams and location

The 2016–17 South West 1 East consisted of fourteen teams; five from Berkshire, four from Oxfordshire, three from Wiltshire and two from Gloucestershire.  Eight of the fourteen teams participated in last season's competition. The season started on 3 September 2016 and the last league matches were played on 22 April 2017. The play-off match was played a week later on 29 April 2017.

League table

Promotion play-off
Each season, the runners-up in South West 1 East and Tribute South West 1 West, participate in a play-off for promotion to National League 3 South West. The team with the best playing record, in this case Newbury, hosted the match and they beat their opponents Clevedon 25 – 22.

2015–16
The 2015–16 South West 1 East consisted of fourteen teams; four from Berkshire, three from Oxfordshire, three from Wiltshire and one each from Bedfordshire, Buckinghamshire, Dorset and Northamptonshire. The season started on 5 September 2015 and ended on 23 April 2016. Towcestrians finished in first place and were promoted to National League 3 South West for next season, along with the runner-up and play-off winner Salisbury.

Participating teams and location
Ten of the fourteen teams participated in last season's competition. The 2014–15 champions Chippenham were promoted to National League 3 South West while Bletchley and Buckingham were relegated to Southern Counties North and Devizes to Southern Counties South.

League table

Promotion play-off
Each season, the runners-up in South West 1 East and Tribute South West 1 West, participate in a play-off for promotion to National League 3 South West. The team with the best playing record, in this case Salisbury, hosted the match and they beat their opponents Thornbury 26 – 24.

Teams 2014–15
Bletchley – promoted from Southern Counties North
Buckingham
Chippenham – relegated from National League 3 South West
Devizes
Grove
Leighton Buzzard 
Maidenhead
Newbury Blues
Reading
Swindon
Towcestrians
Trowbridge – promoted from Southern Counties South
Windsor
Witney

Teams 2013–14
Buckingham
Cheltenham
Devizes – promoted from Southern Counties South
Grove – promoted from Southern Counties North
Maidenhead – relegated from National League 3 South West
Marlow
Newbury Blues
Oxford Harlequins – relegated from National League 3 South West
Reading
Salisbury
Swindon
Towcestrians - transferred from Midlands 1 East
Windsor
Witney

Teams 2012–13
Bletchley
Bracknell
Cheltenham
Coney Hill
High Wycombe
Marlow
Newbury Blues – relegated from National League 3 South West
Old Centralians
Reading
Salisbury
Swanage & Wareham
Swindon
Windsor
Witney

Original teams
When league rugby began in 1987 this division (known as South West 2) contained the following teams:

Barnstaple
Berry Hill
Brixham
Cinderford
Devon & Cornwall Police
Devonport Services
Henley
Launceston
Newbury
Reading
Reading Abbey

South West 1 East honours

South West 2 (1987–1993)
Originally South West 1 East and South West 1 West were combined in a single division called South West 2.  It was a tier 6 league with promotion up to South West 1 and relegation down to either Western Counties or Southern Counties.

South West 2 (1993–1996)
The top six teams from South West 1 and the top six from London 1 were combined to create National 5 South, meaning that South West 2 dropped to become a tier 7 league.  Promotion continued to South West 1 and relegation to either Western Counties or Southern Counties.

South West 2 East (1996–2009)
League restructuring by the RFU for the 1996–97 season saw South West 2 split into two regional divisions known as South West 2 East and South West 2 West, and the cancellation of National 5 South meant that both divisions became tier 6 leagues.  Promotion continued to South West 1, while relegation was now to either Southern Counties North or Southern Counties South.

South West 1 East (2009–present)
League restructuring by the RFU meant that South West 2 East and South West 2 West were renamed as South West 1 East and South West 1 West, with both leagues remaining at tier 6.  Promotion was to National League 3 South West, while relegation continued to either Southern Counties North or Southern Counties South.

Promotion play-offs
Since the 2000–01 season there has been a play-off between the runners-up of South West 1 East and South West 1 West for the third and final promotion place to South West Premier. The team with the superior league record has home advantage. As of the end of the 2019–20 season the South West 1 West teams' have been the stronger with thirteen wins to the South West 1 East teams' six, while the home team has won promotion thirteen times to the away teams six.

Number of league titles

Maidenhead (4)
Oxford Harlequins (3)
Bracknell (2)
Chippenham (2)
Matson (2)
Amersham & Chiltern (1)
Berry Hill (1)
Cheltenham (1)
Chinnor (1)
Cinderford (1)
Cleve (1)
Dorchester (1)
Gloucester Old Boys (1)
Gordon League (1)
Henley (1)
Launceston
Marlow (1)
Newbury Blues (1)
Old Centralians (1)
Old Patesians (1)
Reading Abbey (1)
Redingensians (1)
Salisbury (1)
Stroud (1)
Swanage & Wareham (1)
Towcestrians (1)

See also
South West Division RFU
Berkshire RFU
Buckinghamshire RFU
Dorset & Wilts RFU
Eastern Counties RFU
Oxfordshire RFU
English rugby union system
Rugby union in England

Notes

References

Recurring sporting events established in 1987
Rugby union in Buckinghamshire
Rugby union in Dorset
Rugby union in Wiltshire
6
Rugby union in Bedfordshire
Rugby union in Berkshire
Rugby union in Gloucestershire
Rugby union in Oxfordshire
Sports leagues established in 1987